|}

This is a list of electoral district results for the 1914 Victorian state election.

Results by electoral district

Abbotsford

Albert Park

Allandale

Ballarat East

Ballarat West

Barwon

Benalla

Benambra 

 Two party preferred vote was estimated.

Bendigo East

Bendigo West

Boroondara

Borung

Brighton

Brunswick

Bulla

Carlton

Castlemaine and Maldon

Collingwood

Dalhousie

Dandenong

Daylesford

Dundas

Eaglehawk

East Melbourne

Essendon

Evelyn

Fitzroy

Flemington

Geelong

Gippsland East

Gippsland North 

 Two party preferred vote was estimated.

Gippsland South

Gippsland West

Glenelg

Goulburn Valley

Grenville

Gunbower

Hampden

Hawthorn

Jika Jika

Kara Kara

Korong

Lowan

Maryborough

Melbourne

Mornington

North Melbourne

Ovens

Polwarth

Port Fairy

Port Melbourne

Prahran

Richmond

Rodney 

 Two party preferred vote was estimated.

St Kilda

Stawell and Ararat

Swan Hill

Toorak

Upper Goulburn

Walhalla

Wangaratta

Waranga

Warrenheip

Warrnambool

Williamstown

See also 

 1914 Victorian state election
 Candidates of the 1914 Victorian state election
 Members of the Victorian Legislative Assembly, 1914–1917

References 

Results of Victorian state elections
1910s in Victoria (Australia)